Ranana is a settlement  up the Whanganui River from Whanganui, New Zealand.

Originally known as Kauika, it grew after 1848 as local Māori moved out of fortified pā settlements in peacetime. It was renamed by the missionary Richard Taylor in 1856 for Rānana, a Māori transliteration of London. The town's Catholic church, built in the 1880s for the hapū Ngāti Ruakā of the iwi Te Āti Haunui-a-Pāpārangi, is still in use. Nearby is Moutoa Island, site of a famous battle in 1864.

Ngāti Ruakā and Ngāti Hine Korako have two traditional meeting grounds in Ranana: the Rānana or Ruakā Marae and Te Morehu meeting house, and Te Pou o Rongo Marae and Tūmanako meeting house.

Education

References

Whanganui River
Populated places in Manawatū-Whanganui
Settlements on the Whanganui River
Whanganui District